The 2019–2023 Amaravati protests simply known as Amaravati protests, are ongoing demonstrations in the Indian state of Andhra Pradesh triggered by the idea of three capitals by Government of Andhra Pradesh, and the Expert panel, BCG committee reports. The demonstrations are against the Andhra Pradesh Decentralisation and Inclusive Development of All Regions Act, 2020, which allows the state government to establish three capitals at different locations. This led to concerns that the decision would create chaos and insecurity fears for farmers who gave their fertile agricultural lands to the government in 29 villages of Guntur and Krishna districts. The protests began in Mandadam, Thullur, Uddandarayunipalem on 18 December 2019. In a few days, the protests spread across Andhra Pradesh Capital Region, in Andhra Pradesh. On 17 December 2020, series of events were done to mark the protests' anniversary.

Background

2014–2018 
The Andhra Pradesh Capital Region boasts of one of the oldest habitations in India, going back at least two millennia, and is associated with historic dynasties like Satavahanas and cities such as Dhanyakataka. The last government, wanted to capitalize this region into world-class capital city and wanted to promote glory, rich culture, historical and religional treasure of Andhra Pradesh. It was designed by the Singaporean company, with the masterplan being prepared by two Singapore government appointed consultants and other international consultants in association with both governments in order to develop India's Singapore.

The foundation stone was laid for Amaravati, by the Prime Minister of India Narendra Modi, Former Chief minister Nara Chandrababu Naidu and the Former Chief Justice of India Ranjan Gogoi has laid foundation stone for Andhra Pradesh High Court at Amaravati. However, the Capital city was planned in rich fertile coastal plains on the banks of Krishna river; about 60 km from Bay of Bengal and said to be designed to have 51% of green spaces and 10% of water bodies. Thus, the new riverfront capital took away eminently cultivable land from farmers. For the first time in India, the farmers of Guntur and Krishna districts had gave 33,000 acres of land, to the Government of Andhra Pradesh on land pooling for Amaravati. It had tied up around Rs 17,500 crore with the Housing and Urban Development Corporation, World Bank, Andhra Bank, Asian Infrastructure Investment Bank and planned to raise the balance through public-private partnerships, investments, bonds, lease rental discounting also, it had estimated a budget of over Rs 1 lakh crore for the greenfield capital city. The Government of India, has granted only 2,500 crore and further promised to grant more in future. But, the present government had stopped major projects and contracts backed by APCRDA and Andhra Pradesh Development Corporation Limited (ADCL), stating that the previous government has committed Abuse of information, Insider trading on several properties in Amaravati. Many construction works and road works at amaravati have come to a grinding halt, even as those undertaken by private companies continue albeit slowly, as the government had appointed several committees for review.

2019–present 
In July 2019, the World bank dropped the $300 million Amaravati capital project, and released statement that says "India withdrawn request for financing Amaravati project." After the World bank, Beijing-based Asian Infrastructure Investment Bank has also withdrawn $200 million funding for the Amaravati capital city project and leds the state government into financial crisis for construction of Amaravati.

In November 2019, the Singapore consortium comprising Ascendas-Singbridge and Sembcorp withdrew from the capital city startup area project, after the state government decided not to proceed with the project owing to its other priorities. On building the capital city at Amaravati, Urban development minister Botsa Satyanarayana had said: “Our priority is not to build London or Paris. It is not our priority and not in our capacity also. It is not possible for us to build” and had stated that the Amaravati region was not conducive for building a greenfield capital city and that it was prone to floods. Citing the financial condition of Andhra Pradesh due to the economic slowdown and alleged misdeeds of the previous regime, Finance minister Buggana Rajendranath had expressed inability to continue work on several large projects of Amaravati conceived by the previous government.

In December 2019, Chief minister Y. S. Jaganmohan Reddy announced that the Andhra Pradesh would have three capitals namely as Amaravati in Coastal Andhra as the legislative capital with the state assembly, Visakhapatnam in Uttarandhra as the administrative capital with the state secretariat and Kurnool in Rayalaseema as the judicial capital with the high court. This threw everybody into confusion, including foreign investors who had hedged their bets on the swift development of Amaravati. The farmers, residents of APCR have condemned the comments and dragged into protests against the government.

Timeline

Timeline of the events 
2 June 2014
The Andhra Pradesh bifurcated by carving out the new state called, Telangana.

8 June 2014
Chandrababu Naidu became chief minister of Andhra Pradesh and took office of residuary Andhra Pradesh.

31 December 2014
The Government of Andhra Pradesh notified an area covering 7068 sq. km as the broader Andhra Pradesh Capital Region and the 122 sq. km as the Capital City region.

The Andhra Pradesh Capital Region Development Authority Act, 2014 came into force.

1 April 2015
Andhra Pradesh cabinet approved the decision to name the capital city as Amaravati.

25 May 2015
The Singapore Government has offered the master plan for Amaravati.

22 October 2015
The Prime Minister Narendra Modi has laid foundation stone for the new capital Amaravati along with Chandrababu Naidu, K. Chandrasekhar Rao, Nirmala Sitharaman and Venkaiah Naidu on Amaravati foundation ceremony.

1 July 2017
Chief minister, ministers and senior officers had officially started functioning from Amaravati.

3 February 2019
The Chief Justice of India Ranjan Gogoi has inaugurated the High Court of Andhra Pradesh at Amaravati.

18 March 2019
The Andhra Pradesh High Court have commenced operations from Amaravati.

30 May 2019
Chandrababu Naidu have lost the elections and Jaganmohan Reddy's YSR Congress formed new government.

23 July 2019
World Bank, Asian Infrastructure Investment Bank have announced pulling out of Amaravati project.

13 September 2019
The New Government appointed, an Expert panel committee headed by G.N. Rao to take a review of the developmental plans initiated in Amaravati and also to suggest comprehensive development strategy for all-round development of the state including the capital.

11 November 2019
The Singapore government backed consortium have dropped the Amaravati startup area project.

17 December 2019
Jagan had announced the three capital proposal in the Andhra Pradesh Legislative Assembly by taking South Africa's capital model into consideration.

20 December 2019
The six-member expert panel comprising urban planning experts, have submitted its report to the Chief minister Jaganmohan Reddy.

G. N. Rao further stated that, the panel suggested moving 'some of the capital functions' to other areas in form of Decentralized Government.

29 December 2019
 The Government of Andhra Pradesh also constituted a High power committee to discuss on G. N. Rao Panel and BCG group reports due to widespread public blacklash.

3 January 2020
 The Boston Consulting Group had submitted the report to the government and supported the idea of three capitals.

31 July 2020
 Biswabhusan Harichandan, Governor of Andhra Pradesh approved the repeal of APCRDA and Andhra Pradesh Decentralisation bill

17 December 2020
 Public meeting near the foundation ceremony area (Uddandarayunipalem) to commemorate the one year of the protests.
 12 September 2022
 Amaravati Protests turns 1000 days.
 Farmers began Maha Padayatra across Andhra Pradesh. The protests which began in Amaravati will end on 11 November 2022 at the Arasavalli Sun Temple.

Timeline of the protests 

17 December 2019
Hours after Jagan's announcement, violent demonstrations erupt in Amaravati, especially in Thullur, and other areas in the capital region.

18 December 2019
Farmers held demonstrations on the roads with the cans of pesticides by citing suicide if the Jagan's decision wouldn't withdrawn.

Thousands of farmers and labour union leaders had called for bandh across Mandadam, Velagapudi, Venkatapalem, Krishnayapalem.

19 December 2019
Various public and private departments, stores had openly supported the bandh, and heavy traffic jam obstructed many government vehicles as protestors gathered on the roads.
Protestors also blocked APSRTC buses moving towards Andhra Pradesh Secretariat and Amaralingeswara temple despite the deployment of a huge posse of police in the 29 villages.

11 October 2020
Various farmers, and members of the Amaravati Mahila JAC hold a rally from Thullur and raising slogans of ‘Jai Amaravati’.
Devineni Uma Maheswara Rao participated in a farmers’ rally held at Mylavaram.

Protests and demonstrations 
Amaravati farmers took to the streets with the announcement of Chief minister Jagan's capital decentralization. Reactionary protests were held as well across the Guntur and Krishna districts of Andhra Pradesh. They are protesting on the road with cans of pesticides and have erred in moving the Secretariat and High Court from the already all-encompassing Amaravati. Farmers are demanding that the entire administration of government to stay where it is.

See also 
 List of protests in the 21st century
 2019 Andhra Pradesh Legislative Assembly election
 2006 Indian anti-reservation protests
 Samaikyandhra Movement
 Telangana Movement
 Assam Movement

References

External links
G.249 N.455 Revenue Dept – Andhra Pradesh Capital Recognisation – orders – Issued – The Andhra Pradesh Gazette. 5 June 2018.
 G.1119 N.182 MA & UD Dept  Amaravati Land Allotment (Amendment) – orders – Issued – The Andhra Pradesh Gazette. 8 March 2018.
 	Go.No.RT-934 MA & UD Dept - A.P. Reorganization – Formation of New Capital for the State of A.P.– Website Design, Development and Maintenance for the New Capital City of Andhra Pradesh – Permission accorded – orders – Issued. – APCRDA. 2 December 2014.
A.P. Reorganization Act, 2014 – AP Legislature. 18 February 2014.
 Act No : 6 of 2014 The Andhra Pradesh Reorganisation Act – PRSIndia.org. 18 February 2014.

2019 protests
2020 protests
2021 protests
2022 protests
2023 protests
Protests in India
Politics of Andhra Pradesh
History of Amaravati
History of Andhra Pradesh (2014–present)
2019 in Indian politics
2020 in Indian politics
2021 in Indian politics
2022 in Indian politics
2023 in Indian politics
2010s in Amaravati
2020s in Amaravati
December 2019 events in India
January 2020 events in India
February 2020 events in India
March 2020 events in India
April 2020 events in India
May 2020 events in India
June 2020 events in India
July 2020 events in India
August 2020 events in India
September 2020 events in India
November 2020 events in India
December 2020 events in India
October 2020 events in India
January 2021 events in India
February 2021 events in India
March 2021 events in India
April 2021 events in India
May 2021 events in India
June 2021 events in India
July 2021 events in India
August 2021 events in India
September 2021 events in India
October 2021 events in India
November 2021 events in India
December 2021 events in India
January 2022 events in India
February 2022 events in India
March 2022 events in India
April 2022 events in India
May 2022 events in India
June 2022 events in India
July 2022 events in India
August 2022 events in India
September 2022 events in India
October 2022 events in India
November 2022 events in India
December 2022 events in India
January 2023 events in India
February 2023 events in India
March 2023 events in India